Denis Shapovalov was the defending champion but chose not to defend his title.

Denis Kudla won the title after defeating Benjamin Bonzi 6–0, 7–5 in the final.

Seeds

Draw

Finals

Top half

Bottom half

References
Main Draw
Qualifying Draw

Challenger Banque Nationale de Drummondville - Singles
2018 Singles